This is a list of rivers wholly or partly in Afghanistan, arranged geographically by river basin.

Flowing into the Arabian Sea

Indus River (Pakistan)
Gomal River 
Kundar River 
Zhob River
Kurram River  
Kabul River
Bara River
Kunar River
Pech River
Landai Sin River
Surkhab
Alingar River
Panjshir River
Ghorband River
Salang River
Logar River

Flowing into endorheic basins

Sistan Basin 
Harut River (or Ardaskan River)
Farah River
Helmand River
Khash River
Arghandab River
Dori River
Tarnak River
Arghistan River
Lora River
Musa Qala River
Tirin River
Kaj River

Ab-i Istada 
Ghazni River
Jilga River

Karakum Desert 
Harirud
Jam River
Murghab River
Kushk River
Kashkan River

Aral Sea basin

Amu Darya
Sari Pul River, no longer reaches the Amu Darya
Balkh River, no longer reaches the Amu Darya
Khulm River (formerly Tashkurgan River), no longer reaches the Amu Darya
Kunduz River (or Surkhab River)
Khanabad River
Andarab
Bamiyan River
Kokcha River
Anjuman
Panj River
Aksu (Bartang)
Pamir River
Wakhan River
Shirin Tagab River, no longer reaches the Amu Darya
Shor Darya River

See also
 List of dams and reservoirs in Afghanistan
 Water supply in Afghanistan

References

External links 
 Map of Principal River Drainage Systems at page 12

 
Afghanistan
Rivers